Munakata (written:  or ) is a Japanese surname. Notable people with the surname include:

, Japanese basketball player and coach
Naomi Munakata (1955–2020), Japanese-Brazilian choral conductor
, Japanese artist
, Japanese politician
, Japanese basketball player
Yuko Munakata, American psychologist

Fictional characters
, a character in the video game Danganronpa 3: The End of Hope's Peak High School
, a character in the anime series K
Ryozo Munakata, a character in the video game Fatal Frame II: Crimson Butterfly

Japanese-language surnames